Varanus similis is a small species of monitor lizard. It is often referred to as the Similis monitor or the spotted tree monitor.

It is found in Australia in Queensland and the Northern Territory and in Papua New Guinea.

References

Varanus
Monitor lizards of Australia
Reptiles of Papua New Guinea
Reptiles of Queensland
Reptiles of the Northern Territory
Reptiles described in 1958
Taxa named by Robert Mertens